STS-53 was a NASA Space Shuttle Discovery mission in support of the United States Department of Defense (DoD). The mission was launched on December 2, 1992, from Kennedy Space Center, Florida.

Crew

Mission highlights 
Discovery carried a classified primary payload (DOD-1) for the United States Department of Defense (DoD), two unclassified secondary payloads and nine unclassified middeck experiments.

Discoverys primary payload, USA-89 (1992-086B) is also known as "DoD-1", and was the shuttle's last major payload for the Department of Defense. The satellite was the third launch of a Satellite Data System-2 (SDS 2-3) military communications satellite, after USA-40 on STS-28 and STS-38's deployment of USA-67.

Secondary payloads contained in or attached to Get Away Special (GAS) hardware in the cargo bay included the Orbital Debris Radar Calibration Spheres (ODERACS) satellites and the combined Shuttle Glow Experiment/Cryogenic Heat Pipe Experiment (GCP).

Middeck experiments included Microcapsules in Space (MIS-l); Space Tissue Loss (STL); Visual Function Tester (VFT-2); Cosmic Radiation Effects and Activation Monitor (CREAM); Radiation Monitoring Equipment (RME-III); Fluid Acquisition and Resupply Experiment (FARE); Hand-held, Earth-oriented, Real-time, Cooperative, User-friendly, Location-targeting and Environmental System (HERCULES); Battlefield Laser Acquisition Sensor Test (BLAST); and the Cloud Logic to Optimize Use of Defense Systems (CLOUDS).

Mission insignia 
The five sides represent the Pentagon, the Department of Defense headquarters. The five stars and three stripes of the insignia symbolize the flight's numerical designation in the Space Transportation System's mission sequence.

See also 

 List of human spaceflights
 List of Space Shuttle missions
 Nikon NASA F4
 Outline of space science
 Space Shuttle

References

External links 
 NASA mission summary 
 STS-53 Video Highlights 

Space Shuttle missions
Edwards Air Force Base
Spacecraft launched in 1992
Department of Defense Space Shuttle missions